Wayne Barrett (born 1986) is an American kickboxer who competes in the cruiserweight division. A tall and rangy fighter, Barrett came to prominence as an amateur when he became a WKA national champion and turned professional in 2013. He signed with Glory after just one pro fight.

Career

Early career (2006–2013)
Wayne Barrett began training in karate at ten years old before transitioning to Muay Thai and compiling a record of 19–1 with 15 knockouts as an amateur. He also successfully competed as an amateur boxer, winning a Golden Gloves title in his native Georgia and then relocating to New York City to train under Rob Rogan at Square Circe Muay Thai in Manhattan, Jason Strout for Striking at Church Street Boxing and Kelly Richardson at the Renzo Gracie Fight Academy in Brooklyn. Notable sparring partners of his include Douglas Lima, Jarrell Miller, James Besselman, Costas Philippou, Brian Stann, Gian Villante, David Branch and Eddie Walker.

He defeated Simon Camaj by unanimous decision to claim the WKA Amateur United States Cruiserweight (-86 kg/189 lb) Muay Thai Championship on April 29, 2011 and had his last match in the amateur ranks on December 7, 2012, taking a unanimous decision over Quinton O'Brien.

Barrett made his professional debut on February 22, 2013, at Take-On Muay Thai XIX, winning by technical knockout after forcing twelve fight pro Strahinja Ivanović to retire in round two.

Glory (2013–present)
Following this, Barrett signed with Glory as a competitor in the kickboxing organization's -85 kg/187 lb middleweight division. In his promotional debut against the previously undefeated Mike Lemaire at Glory 9: New York in New York City on June 22, 2013, it took him less than 2 rounds to establish his dominance in the ring as he scored an early standing eight count. In the second round, Barrett dropped Lemaire with a knee before stopping him with a left hook followed by a right cross that sent him crashing to the canvas face first.

In the reserve match for the Glory 10: Los Angeles - Middleweight World Championship Tournament in Ontario, California on September 28, 2013, Barrett delivered another impressive performance as he knocked out the overmatched Robby Plotkin in the first round after flooring him earlier.

Taking a large step up in competition in just his fourth fight, he was matched with the Glory Middleweight Tournament Champion Joe Schilling in the main event of Glory 12: New York in New York City on November 23, 2013. Barrett struck first in the second round when he knocked Schilling down twice. The first knockdown came from a right overhand early in the round and the second from a right hook as the round ended. In the third, Schilling was able to gain some ground back when he connected with a knee that dropped Barrett, but he was able to beat the count. The fight went to the judges and Barrett was awarded a unanimous decision victory.

It was announced during the Glory 15: Istanbul broadcast that Barrett would be one of eight fighters competing in the Glory 17: Los Angeles - Last Man Standing middleweight tournament in Inglewood, California on June 21, 2014. He drew Bogdan Stoica in the quarter-finals and won via third-round knockout when he countered one of the Romanian's signature flying knees with a vicious left hook. In the semis, he met Joe Schilling in a rematch but was unable to replicate his prior success against the Ohio native as he lost a split decision.

Championships and awards

Boxing
Georgia Golden Gloves
Georgia Golden Gloves Championship

Kickboxing
World Kickboxing Association
WKA Amateur United States Cruiserweight (-86 kg/189 lb) Muay Thai Championship

Kickboxing record

Legend:

External links

 Official Glory profile

References

1986 births
Living people
American male kickboxers
Kickboxers from Georgia (U.S. state)
Kickboxers from New York (state)
Cruiserweight kickboxers
American Muay Thai practitioners
Sportspeople from Queens, New York
African-American sportsmen
Glory kickboxers
21st-century African-American sportspeople
20th-century African-American sportspeople